The 1929–30 Irish Cup was the 50th edition of the premier knock-out cup competition in Northern Irish football. 

Linfield won the tournament for the 16th time, defeating holders Ballymena 4–3 in the final at Celtic Park.

Results

First round

|}

Replay

|}

Second replay

|}

Quarter-finals

|}

Replay

|}

Semi-finals

|}

Final

References

External links
 Northern Ireland Cup Finals. Rec.Sport.Soccer Statistics Foundation (RSSSF)

Irish Cup seasons
1929–30 domestic association football cups
1929–30 in Northern Ireland association football